Ashraf Ali Khan is an Indian Politician and a member of Uttar Pradesh Legislative Assembly from Thana Bhawan representing Rashtriya Lok Dal since March 2022.

References 

Uttar Pradesh MLAs 2022–2027
Rashtriya Lok Dal politicians
Living people
1972 births